The 2017 Texas State Bobcats football team represented Texas State University in the 2017 NCAA Division I FBS football season. The Bobcats played their home games at Bobcat Stadium in San Marcos, Texas, and competed in the Sun Belt Conference. They were led by second-year head coach Everett Withers. They finished the season 2–10, 1–7 in Sun Belt play to finish in last place.

Schedule
Texas State announced its 2017 football schedule on March 1, 2017. The 2017 schedule consists of 6 home and away games in the regular season. The Bobcats will host Sun Belt foes Appalachian State, Georgia State, Louisiana–Monroe, and New Mexico State, and will travel to Arkansas State, Coastal Carolina, Louisiana–Lafayette, and Troy.

The Bobcats will host two of the four non-conference opponents, Houston Baptist from the Southland Conference and UTSA from Conference USA, and will travel to Colorado from  the Pac-12 Conference and Wyoming from the Mountain West Conference.
 

Schedule Source:

Game summaries

Houston Baptist

at Colorado

Appalachian State

UTSA

at Wyoming

Louisiana–Monroe

at Louisiana–Lafayette

at Coastal Carolina

New Mexico State

Georgia State

at Arkansas State

at Troy

Coaching staff
After the 2016 season, Texas State lost several coaches to other programs, e.g. Mississippi State, Notre Dame, and Boston College. Withers reached into his past to hire Zak Kuhr from Rutgers. Kuhr was formerly the running backs coach at James Madison University under Coach Withers in 2014 and 2015, adding the co-offensive coordinator title in 2015. Withers filled the remaining openings on the staff with Eric Mateos from LSU and by promoting graduate assistant Preston Mason to full-time.

References

Texas State
Texas State Bobcats football seasons
Texas State Bobcats football